The 2015 Southern Miss Golden Eagles football team represented the University of Southern Mississippi in the 2015 NCAA Division I FBS football season as members of the West Division of Conference USA. They were led by third-year head coach Todd Monken and played their home games at M. M. Roberts Stadium in Hattiesburg, Mississippi. They finished the season 9–5, 7–1 in C-USA play to be champions of the West Division. They represented the West Division in the Conference USA Football Championship Game where they lost to Western Kentucky. They were invited to the Heart of Dallas Bowl, where they were defeated by Washington.

On January 24, 2016, head coach Todd Monken resigned to become the offensive coordinator and wide receivers coach for the Tampa Bay Buccaneers. He finished at Southern Miss with a three-year record of 13–25.

Schedule
Southern Miss announced their 2015 football schedule on February 2, 2015. The 2015 schedule consist of six home and away games in the regular season. The Golden Eagles will host CUSA foes North Texas, Old Dominion, UTEP, and UTSA, and will travel to Charlotte, Louisiana Tech, Marshall, and Rice.

Schedule source:

Game summaries

Mississippi State

Austin Peay

@ Texas State

@ Nebraska

North Texas

@ Marshall

UTSA

@ Charlotte

UTEP

@ Rice

Old Dominion

@ Louisiana Tech

@ Western Kentucky (C–USA Championship Game)

vs. Washington (Heart of Dallas Bowl)

References

Southern Miss
Southern Miss Golden Eagles football seasons
Southern Miss Golden Eagles football